As of the 2020-2021 and the 2021-2022 school years, there are 553 high school football teams competing in the Pennsylvania Interscholastic Athletic Association's (PIAA) 12 Districts.  Each district is divided into numerous leagues and conferences, with an upgrade of the class rankings.  Up until the end of the 2016 school year, there were only four class rankings, ranging from Class A to Class AAAA. At the beginning of the PIAA 2016-17 school year, however, the PIAA added two additional class rankings, making six total.  

The rankings range from Class A (1A) to Class AAAAAA (6A). As of the beginning of the 2020-21 school year, the PIAA will has 87 A class, 101 AA class, 86 AAA class, 104 AAAA class, 91 AAAAA class and 92 AAAAAA class ranked schools competing throughout the football season.  Every two years the PIAA reconfigures the class ranks due to student population changes in Pennsylvania school districts. Listed below are the PIAA football leagues, conferences and teams as of the beginning of the 2020-21 season. The following list of schools does not include every school in Pennsylvania; only schools with PIAA- recognized football teams are included.

PIAA Districts

The PIAA divides its schools into 12 districts for state championship competitions.  All 67 counties in Pennsylvania belong to a distinct district.  The district breakdown and the counties included are as follows:

 District I or District 1 (Bucks, Chester, Delaware and Montgomery).
 District II or District 2 (Lackawanna, Luzerne, Pike, Susquehanna, Wayne and Wyoming).
 District III or District 3 (Adams, Berks, Cumberland, Dauphin, Franklin, Juniata, Lancaster, Lebanon, Perry and York).
 District IV or District 4 (Bradford, Columbia, Lycoming, Montour, Northumberland, Snyder, Sullivan, Tioga and Union).
 District V or District 5 (Bedford, Fulton and Somerset).
 District VI or District 6 (Blair, Cambria, Centre, Clearfield, Clinton, Huntingdon, Indiana and Mifflin).
 District VII (WPIAL) or District 7 (Allegheny, Armstrong, Beaver, Butler, Fayette, Greene, Lawrence, Washington and Westmoreland).
 District VIII or District 8 (Pittsburgh Public Schools)
 District IX or District 9 (Cameron, Clarion, Elk, Jefferson, McKean and Potter).
 District X or District 10 (Crawford, Erie, Forest, Mercer, Venango and Warren).
 District XI or District 11 (Carbon, Lehigh, Monroe, Northampton and Schuylkill).
 District XII or District 12 (Philadelphia) including Philadelphia Catholic League and Public League.

Enrollment Requirements

School Classifications

Conference and League Teams

 State Championships listed in Bold indicate State Champion, Non-bold indicates Runner-Up

Champions

Class AAAAAA
2021: Mount Lebanon (District 7) over Saint Joseph's Prep (District 12) 35-17
2020: Saint Joseph's Prep (District 12) over Central York (District 3) 62-13
2019: Saint Joseph's Prep (District 12) over Central Dauphin (District 3) 35-13
2018: Saint Joseph's Prep (District 12) over Harrisburg (District 3) 40-20
2017: Pine-Richland (District 7) over Saint Joseph's Prep (District 12) 41-21
2016: Saint Joseph's Prep (District 12) over Pittsburgh Central Catholic (District 7) 49-7

Class AAAAA
2020: Pine-Richland (District 7) over Cathedral Prep (District 10) 48-7
2019: Archbishop Wood (District 12) over Cheltenham (District 1) 19-15
2018: Penn Hills (District 7) over Manheim Central (District 3) 36-31
2017: Archbishop Wood (District 12) over Gateway (District 7) 49-14
2016: Archbishop Wood (District 12) over Harrisburg (District 3) 37-10

Class AAAA
2020: Thomas Jefferson (District 7) over Jersey Shore Area (District 4) 21-14
2019: Thomas Jefferson (District 7) over Dallas (District 2) 46-7
2018: Cathedral Prep (District 10) over Imhotep Charter (District 12) 38-7
2017: Cathedral Prep (District 10) over Imhotep Charter (District 12) 38-28
2016: Cathedral Prep (District 10) over Imhotep Charter (District 12) 27-20
2015: Pittsburgh Central Catholic (District 7) over Parkland (District 11) 21-18
2014: Saint Joseph's Prep (District 12) over Pine-Richland (District 7) 49-41
2013: Saint Joseph's Prep (District 12) over Pittsburgh Central Catholic (District 7) 35-10
2012: North Allegheny (District 7) over Coatesville (District 1) 63-28
2011: Central Dauphin (District 3) over North Penn (District 1) 14-7
2010: North Allegheny (District 7) over La Salle College (District 12) 21-0
2009: La Salle College (District 12) over State College (District 6) 24-7
2008: Liberty (District 11) over Bethel Park (District 7) 28-21 (OT)
2007: Pittsburgh Central Catholic (District 7) over Parkland (District 11) 35-21
2006: Upper St. Clair (District 7) over Liberty (District 11) 47-13
2005: McKeesport (District 7) over Liberty (District 11) 49-10
2004: Pittsburgh Central Catholic (District 7) over Neshaminy (District 1) 49-14
2003: North Penn (District 1) over Pittsburgh Central Catholic (District 7) 37-10
2002: Parkland (District 11) over Woodland Hills (District 7) 34-12
2001: Neshaminy (District 1) over Woodland Hills (District 7) 21-7
2000: Cathedral Prep (District 10) over Central Bucks West (District 1) 41-35 (OT)
1999: Central Bucks West (District 1) over Cathedral Prep (District 10) 14-13
1998: Central Bucks West (District 1) over New Castle (District 7) 56-7
1997: Central Bucks West (District 1) over  Upper St. Clair (District 7) 44-20
1996: Downingtown (District 1) over Woodland Hills (District 7) 49-14
1995: Penn Hills (District 7) over Lower Dauphin (District 3) 35-14
1994: McKeesport (District 7) over Downingtown (District 1) 17-14
1993: North Hills (District 7) over Central Bucks West (District 1) 15-14
1992: Cumberland Valley (District 3) over Upper St. Clair (District 7) 28-12
1991: Central Bucks West (District 1) over Cathedral Prep (District 10) 26-14
1990: North Allegheny (District 7) over Ridley (District 1) 21-14
1989: Upper St. Clair (District 7) over Wilson (District 3) 12-7
1988: Pittsburgh Central Catholic (District 7) over Cedar Cliff (District 3) 14-7

Class AAA
2018: Aliquippa (District 7) over Middletown (District 3) 35-0
2017: Quaker Valley (District 7) over Middletown (District 3) 41-24
2016: Beaver Falls (District 7) over Middletown (District 3) 30-13
2015: Imhotep Charter (District 12) over Cathedral Prep (District 10) 40-3
2014: Archbishop Wood (District 12) over Central Valley (District 7) 33-14
2013: Archbishop Wood (District 12) over Bishop McDevitt (District 3) 22-10
2012: Cathedral Prep (District 10) over Archbishop Wood (District 12) 24-14
2011: Archbishop Wood (District 12) over Bishop McDevitt (District 3) 52-0
2010: Allentown Central Catholic (District 11) over Bishop McDevitt (District 3) 28-27
2009: Selinsgrove (District 4) over Manheim Central(District 3) 10-7
2008: Thomas Jefferson (District 7) over Archbishop Wood (District 12) 34-7
2007: Thomas Jefferson (District 7) over Garnet Valley (District 1) 28-3
2006: General McLane (District 10) over Pottsville (District 11) 28-23
2005: Franklin Regional (District 7) over Pottsville (District 11) 23-13
2004: Thomas Jefferson (District 7) over Manheim Central (District 3) 56-20
2003: Manheim Central (District 3) over Pine-Richland (District 7) 39-38 (2OT)
2002: Hopewell (District 7) over Strath Haven (District 1) 21-10
2001: West Allegheny (District 7) over Strath Haven (District 1) 28-13
2000: Strath Haven (District 1) over West Allegheny (District 7) 31-28
1999: Strath Haven (District 1) over West Allegheny (District 7) 21-7
1998: Allentown Central Catholic (District 11) over Moon (District 7) 10-0
1997: Berwick (District 2) over Perry Traditional Academy (District 8) 17-14
1996: Berwick (District 2) over Blackhawk (District 7) 34-14
1995: Berwick (District 2) over Sharon (District 10) 43-6
1994: Berwick (District 2) over Sharon (District 10) 27-7
1993: Allentown Central Catholic (District 11) over Blackhawk (District 7) 40-0
1992: Berwick (District 2) over Blackhawk (District 7) 33-6
1991: Strong Vincent (District 10) over Conestoga Valley (District 3) 29-20
1990: Bethlehem Catholic (District 11) over Seton-La Salle (District 7) 43-7
1989: Perry Traditional Academy (District 8) over Berwick (District 2) 20-8
1988: Berwick (District 2) over Aliquippa (District 7) 13-0

Class AA
2018:Southern Columbia (District 4) over Wilmington (District 10) 49-14
2017: Southern Columbia (District 4) over Wilmington (District 10) 48-0
2016: Steel Valley (District 7) over Southern Columbia (District 4) 49-7
2015: Southern Columbia (District 4) over Aliquippa (District 7) 49-14
2014: South Fayette (District 7) over Dunmore (District 2) 28-16
2013: South Fayette (District 7) over Imhotep Charter (District 12) 41-0
2012: Wyomissing Area (District 3) over Aliquippa (District 7) 17-14
2011: Lancaster Catholic (District 3) over Tyrone (District 6) 17-7
2010: West Catholic (District 12) over South Fayette (District 7) 50-14
2009: Lancaster Catholic (District 3) over Greensburg Central Catholic (District 7) 21-14
2008: Wilmington (District 10) over West Catholic (District 12) 35-34 (2OT)
2007: Jeannette (District  7) over Dunmore (District 2) 49-21
2006: Wilson Area (District 11) over Jeannette (District 7) 29-28
2005: South Park (District 7) over Wilson Area (District 11) 28-17
2004: Lansdale Catholic (District 1) Grove City (District 10) 40-17
2003: Aliquippa (District 7) over Northern Lehigh (District 11) 32-27
2002: Mount Carmel (District 4) over Seton-La Salle (District 7) 18-13
2001: Washington (District 7) over Pen Argyl (District 11) 19-12
2000: Mount Carmel (District 4) over Aliquippa (District 7) 26-6
1999: Tyrone (District 6) over Mount Carmel (District 4) 13-6
1998: Mount Carmel (District 4) over Shady Side Academy (District 7) 44-7
1997: South Park (District 7) over South Williamsport (District 4) 20-0
1996: Mount Carmel (District 4) over Tyrone (District 6) 25-6
1995: Bishop McDevitt (District 3) over Burrell (District 7) 29-0
1994: Mount Carmel (District 4) over Forest Hills (District 6) 20-14 (OT)
1993: Dallas (District 2) over Washington (District 7) 31-7
1992: Valley View (District 2) over East Allegheny (District 7) 21-13
1991: Aliquippa (District 7) over Hanover Area (District 2) 27-0
1990: Hanover Area (District 2) over Bishop Canevin (District 7) 20-19 (OT)
1989: Hickory (District 10) over Montoursville (District 4) 30-22
1988: Bethlehem Catholic (District 11) over Wilmington (District 10) 26-11

Class A
2018: Farrell (District 10) over Lackawanna Trail (District 2) 55-20
2017: Jeannette (District  7) over Homer-Center (District 6) 42-12
2016: Bishop Guilfoyle (District 6) over Clairton (District 7) 17-0
2015: Bishop Guilfoyle (District 6) over Farrell (District 10) 35-0
2014: Bishop Guilfoyle (District 6) over Clairton (District 7) 19-18
2013: North Catholic (District 7) over Old Forge (District 2) 15-14 (OT)
2012: Clairton (District 7) over Dunmore (District 2) 20-0
2011: Clairton (District 7) over Southern Columbia (District 4) 35-19
2010: Clairton (District 7) over Riverside (District 2) 36-30
2009: Clairton (District 7) over Bishop McCort (District 6) 15-3
2008: Steelton-Highspire (District 3) over Clairton (District 7) 35-16
2007: Steelton-Highspire (District 3) over Serra Catholic (District 7) 34-15
2006: Southern Columbia (District 4) over West Middlesex (District 10) 56-14
2005: Southern Columbia (District 4) over Duquesne (District 7) 50-19
2004: Southern Columbia (District 4) over Rochester (District 7) 35-0
2003: Southern Columbia (District 4) over Bishop Carroll (District 6) 49-20
2002: Southern Columbia (District 4) over Rochester (District 7) 31-6
2001: Rochester (District 7) over Southern Columbia (District 4) 16-0
2000: Rochester (District 7) over Southern Columbia (District 4) 22-14
1999: South Side (District 7) over Southern Columbia (District 4) 27-21
1998: Rochester (District 7) over Southern Columbia (District 4) 18-0
1997: Sharpsville (District 10) over Riverside (District 2) 10-7
1996: Farrell (District 10) over Southern Columbia (District 4) 14-12
1995: Farrell (District 10) over Southern Columbia (District 4) 6-0
1994: Southern Columbia (District 4) over Western Beaver (District 7) 49-6
1993: Duquesne (District 7) over South Williamsport (District 4) 24-21
1992: Scotland School (District 3) over Smethport (District 9) 24-7
1992: Shenandoah Valley Junior Senior High School (District 11) over Schuylkill Haven 10-0
1991: Schuylkill Haven (District 11) over Rochester (District 7) 28-18
1990: Marian Catholic (District 11) over Farrell (District 10) 21-13
1989: Dunmore (District 2) over Keystone (District 9) 57-18
1988: Camp Hill (Division 3) over Cambridge Springs (District 10) 18-7

Non-PIAA Schools

The following schools are not recognized by the PIAA as of the 2018-19 school year.

Cooperative Football Teams

The following schools have co-oped with another school in high school football competition.

Program drops

The following schools have decided to stop or temporarily cancel the high school football program as of the 2018-19 season.

Past Schools

PIAA Conferences

 Berks Inter-County 1 Conference
 Berks Inter-County 2 Conference
 Bicentennial Conference
 Central Conference
 Ches-Mont American Conference
 Ches-Mont National Conference 
 Colonial League 
 Delaware Valley Conference 
 District IV Conference
 District 9 - Large Conference
 District 9 - Small North Conference
 District 9 - Small South Conference
 District 10 Region 1 Conference
 District 10 Region 2 Conference
 District 10 Region 3 Conference
 District 10 Region 4 Conference
 District 10 Region 5 Conference
 District 10 Region 6 Conference
 District 10 Region 7 Conference
 District 10 Region 8 Conference
 Eastern Pennsylvania Conference - North
 Eastern Pennsylvania Conference - South 
 Freelance Conference
 Heartland I Conference
 Heartland II Conference
 Heartland III Conference
 Heritage Conference
 Independence Conference
 Inter-County Conference
 Lackawanna 1 Conference 
 Lackawanna 2 Conference
 Lackawanna 3 Conference
 Lackawanna 4 Conference
 Lancaster-Lebanon 1 Conference
 Lancaster-Lebanon 2 Conference
 Lancaster-Lebanon 3 Conference 
 Laurel Highlands Conference
 Mid-Penn Capital Conference
 Mid-Penn Colonial Conference
 Mid-Penn Commonwealth Conference 
 Mid-Penn Keystone Conference
 Mountain Conference 
 Northern Tier - Large Conference
 Northern Tier - Small Conference 
 Philadelphia Catholic League - Blue Conference 
 Philadelphia Catholic League - Red Conference 
 Philadelphia Public - American Conference 
 Philadelphia Public - Independence Conference
 Philadelphia Public - Liberty Conference  
 Philadelphia Public - National Conference
 Pioneer Frontier Conference
 Pioneer Liberty Conference
 Pittsburgh City League Conference
 Schuylkill League - Division 1
 Schuylkill League - Division 2
 Suburban One League (American Conference) 
 Suburban One League (Continental Conference)
 Suburban One League (National Conference) 
 Tri-Valley Conference
 Western Pennsylvania Athletic Conference (WPAC)
 WPIAL 6A Conference
 WPIAL 5A Allegheny Eight Conference 
 WPIAL 5A Big East Conference
 WPIAL 5A Northern Conference
 WPIAL 4A Big Nine Conference
 WPIAL 4A Northwest Eight Conference
 WPIAL 3A Beaver Valley Conference
 WPIAL 3A Interstate Conference
 WPIAL 2A Allegheny Conference
 WPIAL 2A Century Conference
 WPIAL 2A Midwestern Conference
 WPIAL 2A Three Rivers Conference
 WPIAL 1A Big Seven Conference
 WPIAL 1A Eastern Conference
 WPIAL 1A Tri-County South Conference
 WPIAL Northwest Eight Conference
 Wyoming Valley 1 Conference
 Wyoming Valley 2 Conference
 Wyoming Valley 3 Conference
 York-Adams 1 Conference
 York-Adams 2 Conference
 York-Adams 3 Conference

Past seasons
2016 PIAA football season

See also

 High school football

References

External links
Official website

American football in Pennsylvania
Pennsylvania Interscholastic Athletic Association
High school football in the United States